Angongwi is a river in Ghana. It drains into the Volta River just before the Volta drains into the Gulf of Guinea.

References

Rivers of Ghana